This is a list of historical administrative divisions of Serbia since the establishment of the Principality of Serbia until today.

Principality of Serbia

1819–1833
12 nahije ( nahija, from Ottoman nahiye), 45 knežine ( knežina), 1,396 villages and towns.

1834–1836
In 1833, six nahiye were ceded to Serbia with the "Third Hatišerif", an edict (hatt-i sharif) issued by Sultan Mahmud II (r. 1808–1839). In 1834, the Parliament decided that Serbia be divided on five governorships (serdarstvo) and 19 districts (okrug), thereby ending the form of administrative units that originated in the Ottoman Empire. The districts were in turn divided into captaincies (kapetanije), later called srezovi ( srez).

1836–1878

Kingdom of Serbia

Serbia gained full internationally recognized independence in 1878 and proclaimed a Kingdom in 1882. In 1890, it was divided into 15 districts (okruzi) which were further divided into counties (srezovi). Cities of Belgrade and Niš had special administrative status. The districts were: Valjevo, Vranje, Kragujevac, Krajina, Kruševac, Morava, Pirot, Podrinje, Podunavlje, Požarevac, Rudnik, Timok, Toplica, Užice and Crna Reka. In 1900 the Podunavlje district was divided into the districts of Belgrade and Smederevo and in 1902 the district of Čačak was separated from Rudnik district.

In 1912 and 1913 Serbia enlarged its territory after victorious First Balkan War. In August 1913, 11 new districts were formed in the newly liberated areas: Bitola, Debar, Kavadarci, Novi Pazar, Kumanovo, Pljevlja, Prizren, Priština, Skopje, Tetovo and Štip. Few months later, Pljevlja and Debar districts were abolished and the new Prijepolje and Ohrid districts formed instead. A new Zvečan district was formed as well.

Kingdom of Serbs, Croats and Slovenes

Pokrajinas
Serbia
North Serbia
South Serbia
Montenegro
Bosnia and Herzegovina
Dalmatia
Croatia and Slavonia
Slovenia
Banat, Bačka and Baranja

Oblasts
 Bačka
 Belgrade
 Bihać
 Bitolj
 Bregalnica
 Dubrovnik
 Kosovo
 Ljubljana
 Maribor
 Morava
 Mostar
 Niš
 Osijek
 Podrinje
 Podunavlje
 Požarevac
 Primorje-Krajina
 Kruševac
 Raška
 Sarajevo
 Skoplje
 Split
 Syrmia
 Šumadija
 Timok
 Travnik
 Tuzla
 Užice
 Valjevo
 Vranje
 Vrbas
 Zagreb
 Zeta

SR Serbia

The Socialist Republic of Serbia, and later the Republic of Serbia (from September 28, 1990) had a complex administrative division whereby Central Serbia  was subdivided into nine Intermunicipal Regional Communities (Međuopštinske regionalne zajednice - MRZ). These were:

The City of Belgrade (numbered 1 on the map) was considered the capital city of Serbia and officially designated as the Collectivity of City Municipalities of Belgrade, also known as Greater Belgrade (or the Metropolitan Area of Belgrade) in geographical literature.

MRZs existed officially until December 31, 1990.

See also
Administrative divisions of Serbia in the Middle Ages

References